Bagh-e Gar (also Romanized as Bāgh-e Gar; also known as Gar) is a village in Jolgah Rural District, in the Central District of Jahrom County, Fars Province, Iran. At the 2006 census, its population was 185, in 44 families.

References 

Populated places in Jahrom County